The Communauté de communes de la Région de Frévent was located in the Pas-de-Calais département, in northern France. It was created in January 1999. It was merged into the new Communauté de communes du Ternois in January 2017.

Composition
It comprised the following 12 communes:

Frévent  
Bonnières  
Boubers-sur-Canche 
Nuncq-Hautecôte  
Bouret-sur-Canche 
Ligny-sur-Canche  
Conchy-sur-Canche 
Fortel-en-Artois 
Aubrometz 
Vacquerie-le-Boucq 
Monchel-sur-Canche 
Canteleux

References 

Frevent